Alkersum (Fering: Aalkersem) is a municipality in the Nordfriesland district, in Schleswig-Holstein, northern Germany.

Geography
Alkersum is situated in the center of the island in the geestland of Föhr.

History
First settlements in the area occurred in the Iron Age.

Politics
Since the communal elections of 2008, the Alkersumer Wählergemeinschaft holds all nine seats in the municipality council.

Economy
Several enterprises have settled in the outskirts of the village. Also tourism and horse ranches are an important factor.

Culture
In August 2009 the Museum Kunst der Westküste (Museum of Fine Arts of the West Coast) opened in Alkersum. It displays artworks that focus on the North Sea and its shore. Notable artists include Edvard Munch, Emil Nolde, Max Liebermann and others.

Notable people
Frederik Paulsen (1909–1997), founder of Ferring Pharmaceuticals

References

External links

Alkersum

Föhr
Nordfriesland